Garnet Edwin Driver (26 May 1883 – 7 September 1916) was a South African first-class cricketer, solicitor, and South African Army officer.

The son of Edwin James Driver, he was born at Pietermaritzburg in May 1883. He was educated at both Hilton College and Maritzburg College. After completing his education, he became a solicitor and a conveyancer. Driver was an all-round sportsman, playing rugby union for Wasps and club cricket for Standard Cricket Club. He played a single first-class cricket match for Griqualand West against Western Province at Kimberley in 1903 in the Currie Cup. He performed well in the match, being dismissed for scores of 37 and 62 by Charles Bain and Bonnor Middleton respectively, but did not feature again in first-class cricket.

Driver served in the First World War with the South African Army, being commissioned into the 8th South African Horse in November 1914. He was later promoted to the temporary rank of lieutenant in May 1916, with seniority antedated to November 1914. On 22 May 1916, he embarked for German East Africa. He was seriously wounded in action and captured during the Battle of Kisaki on 7 September 1916, dying from his wounds on the same day. He was posthumously mentioned in dispatches for 'meritorious service in the field in East Africa'. He was buried at the Morogoro Cemetery. Driver was survived by his wife Ruby Adelaide Driver, with whom he had a daughter.

References

External links

1883 births
1916 deaths
People from Pietermaritzburg
Alumni of Hilton College (South Africa)
Alumni of Maritzburg College
South African cricketers
Northern Cape cricketers
South African Army officers
South African military personnel of World War I
South African prisoners of war
South African military personnel killed in World War I
World War I prisoners of war held by Germany